Seclusion is the act of secluding (i.e. isolating from society), the state of being secluded, or a place that facilitates it (a secluded place). A person, couple, or larger group may go to a secluded place for privacy or peace and quiet. The seclusion of an individual is called solitude.

Restrictions on the seclusion of a man and a woman

In some cases where there are legal, religious or social restrictions on two people having physical intimacy, there may be restrictions on being together in a secluded place. For example, under traditional schools of sharia or Islamic law, a man and a woman who are not married and not mahram, being together in a house, a bathroom, or a secluded place, may be forbidden. A man and woman could be in a secluded area for work purposes, just talking, or anything that does not allow them to pass their limits. See also yichud—a similar rule in Judaism.

As a therapy

Seclusion may be used as a control tactic in psychological treatment settings. Seclusion of an agitated person in a quiet room free of stimulation may help de-escalate a situation which may be dangerous to the agitated person or those around him.

In relation to administering medications, seclusion is a tactic devised for those unwilling to proceed with instructions. Patients who are secluded due to aggressive behaviour should not be given drug treatment to calm them down, but restraint measures should be taken into consideration. Other measures, such as behavioural therapy, should be considered when assessing the care of the patient.

Seclusion must only be used in the best interest of the patient, it must only be used as a last resort method, and it must not be prolonged as a form of punishment on the patient. In Ireland, The Mental Health Commission governs seclusion in psychiatric institutions. The act states that people can only be placed in seclusion if
 it prevents them from hurting themselves and/or others
 and it complies with the rules set out by the commission.

To prevent contagious disease transmission self-isolation is used as a public health measure.

References

Treatment of mental disorders